John Clifford is an American producer, director, author, choreographer, and dancer. He was the founder and artistic director of the original Los Angeles Ballet (1974–85) and the chamber-sized touring ensemble, Ballet of Los Angeles (1988–91). Before that time, Clifford was a principal dancer and choreographer (8 ballets before age 26) with George Balanchine’s New York City Ballet (1966–74). Balanchine invited him back as a guest artist numerous times, and his last performances with the company were in 1980.

Clifford was the artistic director of Robert Redford's Sundance Institute Video/Choreographer Program and produced “Pas De Deux,” a video distributed by Video Artists International (VAI).

His new for-profit dance company Los Angeles Dance Theater produced for Warner Bros Theatre Ventures, Inc. a dance version of Casablanca; CASABLANCA: The Dance. The production premiered on April 5, 2005 at the Great Hall of the People in Beijing, China.

Mr. Clifford is a senior répétiteur for the George Balanchine Trust and has staged numerous Balanchine ballets for companies including the Paris Opera Ballet (9), the Bolshoi Ballet (3), the Mariinsky Ballet (2), the San Francisco Ballet (3), etc., and most of the ballet companies in the United States. As a choreographer, companies such as the Deutsche Oper Ballet, Zurich Ballet, Le Ballet de Monte Carlo, Ballet du Nord (France), Maggio Danza, Rome Opéra Ballet, and the Teatro Colon in Buenos Aires produced an all-Clifford program in 1985.

His autobiography; BALANCHINE’S APPRENTICE: From Hollywood to New York and Back, published by the University Press of Florida, has received reviews in the Wall Street Journal, Publishers Weekly, and Library Journal.

References

External links 
Los Angeles Dance Theater home page
 Art of the Pas De Deux

Living people
Ballet choreographers
New York City Ballet principal dancers
American male ballet dancers
Balanchine Trust repetiteurs
Ballet masters
1947 births